Allhartsberg is a town in the district of Amstetten in Lower Austria in Austria.

Eckes-Granini Austria is headquartered in Allhartsberg.

References

External links
 Allhartsberg

Cities and towns in Amstetten District